The 1999 Bolsover District Council election took place on 6 May 1999 to elect members of Bolsover District Council in Derbyshire, England. The whole council was up for election and the Labour party stayed in overall control of the council.

Election result

References

1999
1999 English local elections
1990s in Derbyshire